Events in the year 1953 in Bolivia.

Incumbents 
 President: Víctor Paz Estenssoro (MNR)
 Vice President: Hernán Siles Zuazo (MNR)

Ongoing events 
 Bolivian National Revolution (1952–1964)

Events 
 2 August – President Víctor Paz Estenssoro signs Supreme Decree N° 3464 into law, passing sweeping agrarian reform and declaring peasants the owners of their own lands.

Births 
 12 August – Carlos Mesa, 63rd president of Bolivia, 37th vice president of Bolivia.

Deaths

References

Notes

Footnotes 

 
1900s in Bolivia
Bolivia
Bolivia
Years of the 20th century in Bolivia